Stembridge is a surname. Notable people with the surname include:

Gerard Stembridge (born 1958), Irish writer, director, and actor
James Stembridge, American prop weapons supplier
John Stembridge, American mathematician
Terry Stembridge, American basketball broadcaster

English-language surnames